Obira Dam  is a gravity dam located in Hokkaido Prefecture in Japan. The dam is used for flood control, irrigation and water supply. The catchment area of the dam is 186.1 km2. The dam impounds about 265  ha of land when full and can store 33200 thousand cubic meters of water. The construction of the dam was started on 1972 and completed in 1992.

References

Dams in Hokkaido